Autonomous Region in Muslim Mindanao general elections were held for the first time in the newly expanded Autonomous Region in Muslim Mindanao. In 2001, Republic Act No. 9054 was passed for the expansion of the ARMM to include the areas which initially rejected inclusion and the provinces which were carved from them, however only Marawi City and Basilan with the exception of Isabela City opted to be integrated in the region. Special ARMM Elections for the regional governor and vice-governor posts happened on November 26, 2001.

Results

Regional governor

Regional vice-governor

References

External links
Official Results
Commission on Elections
Politics of the Philippines
Philippine elections
Republic Act No. 9054

2001
2001 elections in the Philippines
2001 in the Philippines